Major General Maharaja Sawai Man Singh II GCSI GCIE (born Sawai Mor Mukut Singh; 21 August 1912 – 24 June 1970) was an Indian prince, government official, diplomat and sportsman.  

Man Singh II was the ruling Maharaja of the princely state of Jaipur in the British Raj from 1922 to 1947. In 1948, after the state was absorbed into independent India, he was granted a privy purse, certain privileges, and the continued use of the title Maharaja of Jaipur by the Government of India, which he retained until his death in 1970.  He also held the office of Rajpramukh (Governor) of Rajasthan between 1949 and 1956. In later life, he served as Ambassador of India to Spain. He was a notable polo player.

Early life
Sawai Man Singh II, was born Mor Mukut Singh, the second son of Thakur Sawai Singh of Isarda by his wife Sugan Kunwar, a lady from Kotla village in Uttar Pradesh. His father was a nobleman belonging to the Kachhwaha clan of Rajputs. Mor Mukut grew up in the dusty, walled township of Isarda, a chief of thikana of the Rajawat sub-clan which lies between the towns of Sawai Madhopur and Jaipur in present-day Rajasthan. His family was connected to the ruling house of Jaipur and Kotah (where his father's sister was married). The then-Maharaja of Jaipur, Sawai Madho Singh II, had been born the son of a former Thakur of Isarda and had been adopted into the ruling family of Jaipur. After giving him up for adoption, Madho Singh's actual father had in turn lacked for an heir. He adopted the son of a distant kinsman and was succeeded by that lad as Thakur of Isarda. That lad was Sawai Singh, father of Mor Mukut Singh. In this manner, Mor Mukut could be reckoned near kin to Maharaja Madho Singh II of Jaipur.

After being adopted to become Maharaja of Jaipur, Madho Singh II had numerous (no less than 65) children by various concubines, but the highly superstitious Maharaja was warned by a sage against having legitimate heirs and thus took great care not to impregnate his five wives. On 24 March 1921, Madho Singh II adopted Mor Mukut to be his son and heir. The boy was given the name "Man Singh" upon his adoption. Madho Singh II died on 7 September 1922 and was succeeded by Man Singh as Maharaja of Jaipur and head of the Kachwaha clan of Rajputs. The new Maharaja was ten years old.

Maharaja of Jaipur
Upon obtaining his ruling powers, Man Singh embarked on a programme of modernisation, creating infrastructure and founding numerous public institutions that would later result in Jaipur being selected the capital of Rajasthan. At the time of the Independence of British India in 1947, the maharaja delayed acceding Jaipur to the Dominion of India. He finally signed an Instrument of Accession in April 1949, when his princely state became part of the Rajasthan States Union, initially retaining his powers of internal government. The Maharaja became Rajpramukh of the States Union, but the office was abolished when the Indian states were further re-organised in 1956. Although the Indian princes had by then relinquished their ruling powers, they remained entitled to their titles, privy purses, and other privileges until the adoption of the 26th amendment to the Constitution of India on 28 December 1971. Accordingly, Sir Man Singh II remained Maharaja of Jaipur until his death.

In 1958, Sir Man Singh was one of several rulers who realised the potential of tourism in Rajasthan, turning Rambagh Palace into a luxury hotel. Under his rule various laws of land reform were first introduced in his state, such as the Jaipur Tenancy Act.  Later in 1956, the Jagidari (feudal) form of political administration were abolished during the government of the Congress Party in India. In 1962 he was elected to Council of States, the Rajya Sabha the Upper House of Indian Parliament with term till 1968, however in 1965, the Indian government appointed Sawai Man Singh, Indian Ambassador to Spain. Utilising his various contacts in Europe, he spent much of his time in Europe to ensue new military technology and arms-deal for the Indian army (Crewe).

He was especially noted as an enthusiastic (10-Goal) polo player, winning among other trophies the World Cup in 1933. The Sawai Mansingh Stadium in Jaipur is named in his honour. During the 1950s, Man Singh owned Saint Hill Manor in East Grinstead, West Sussex, which was sold to L. Ron Hubbard, founder of Scientology in 1959.

Personal life

Marriages
Man Singh II was married three times, and his three wives lived in the same household together, in accordance with Rajput custom. His first two marriages were to suitable brides chosen from the royal family of Jodhpur, whose Rajput heritage and social ranking were similar to his own. The senior Maharani, known within the palace as 'First her Highness,' was Marudhar Kunwar, sister of Sumer Singh, Maharaja of Jodhpur. She was about twelve years older than him and bore him two children: first a daughter, Prem Kumari, and then his eldest son and heir, Bhawani Singh. His second wife was Maharani Kishore Kanwar, niece of his first wife and daughter of Maharaja Sumer Singh of Jodhpur. She was five years younger than he and bore him two sons.

He was briefly involved with English socialite Lady Ursula Manners.

In 1940, Man Singh II married for the third and last time. His bride was the legendary beauty Gayatri Devi of Cooch Behar, the daughter of Maharaja Jitendra Narayan of Cooch Behar and Maharani Indira Devi, princess of Baroda. She stands out among the Maharanis of Jaipur for having become a public figure and a celebrity of sorts, initially for being a fashion-conscious beauty and later for becoming a politician and parliamentarian. She bore him one son and survived him by thirty-nine years, dying in 2009.

Children
Man Singh was the father of four sons and a daughter, borne to him by his three wives. They were:
By his first wife, Maharani Marudhar Kunwar, one son and one daughter
 Prem Kumari (1929–1970). In 1948, she was given in marriage to the Maharawal of Baria. She had one daughter.
 Bhawani Singh (1931–2011), succeeded to his father's title in 1970. In 1967, he married Padmini Devi, daughter of the Raja of Sirmur, and had one daughter;
 Diya Kumari (b. 1970). She has three children, including one son who was adopted by Bhawani Singh and declared his successor, namely:
 Padmanabh Singh (b. 1998). Born a commoner, he was declared royal and adopted by his maternal grandfather in 2002.

By his second wife, Maharani Kishore Kunwar, two sons
 Jai Singh (b. 1933). he was given the title of Raja of Jhalai and the estate of Jhalai in appanage by his father. In 1983, he married Vidya Devi, daughter of the Raja of Jubbal, and has one son. 
 Ajay Singh
 Prithviraj (1935–2020); received the title Raja of Bhagwatgarth. In 1961, he married Devika Devi, a princess of Tripura and a niece (sister's daughter) of his step-mother Gayatri Devi. They had been living separately from each other by the time she died in 2009, a few months before her aunt. Gayatri Devi tended to support her step-son and deprecate her niece in the matter of their marital differences, and Prithviraj Singh remained close to his step-mother all his life. Prithviraj and Devika had one son together:
 Vijit Singh, who in 1991 married Minakshi Devi, daughter of the Maharaja of Lunawada, and has three children; two sons named Vedant Singh (b. 1992) and Siddhant Singh (b. 1996), and a daughter Mokshita (b. 1993).

By his third wife, Gayatri Devi (1919–2009)
 Prince Jagat Singh, (1949–1997) received the title Raja of Isarda was married in 1978 (divorced 1987) to a Thai princess. He had two children by her, namely,
 Lalitya Kumari (b. 1979), daughter
 Devraj Singh, (b. 1981), son

Death

In 1970, Man Singh had an accident while playing polo in Cirencester, England. He died later the same day. He was survived by his four sons. He was succeeded as Maharaja of Jaipur and head of the Kachwaha clan by his eldest son, Maharaja Sawai Bhawani Singh of Jaipur.  Following his death Indira Gandhi was finally able to repress the power of India's former rulers in democratic India as they formed a large bulk of her opposition party, the Swatantra party.

A statue of Sawai Man Singh was installed at the Ram Niwas Bagh in Jaipur, the statue was unveiled at a grand function on 30 March 2005. A Cricket Stadium in Jaipur was named after him. His wife Gayatri Devi also made a school after him and was named Maharaja Sawai Man Singh Vidyalaya.

His successor, Maharaja Sawai Bhawani Singh of Jaipur died on 17 April 2011, aged 79.

See also

Jaipur State
Gayatri Devi
Man Singh I

References

Works cited 
 

Knights Grand Commander of the Order of the Star of India
Knights Grand Commander of the Order of the Indian Empire
1912 births
1970 deaths
20th-century Indian monarchs
Indian polo players
Accidental deaths in England
Sport deaths in England
Polo deaths
Ambassadors of India to Spain
People from Jaipur
Maharajas of Jaipur
Indian knights
Indian Hindus
Rajpramukhs
Polo players from Rajasthan
Rajya Sabha members from Rajasthan